Sedat Yeşilkaya (born 10 June 1980) is a Turkish professional footballer who plays as an attacking midfielder for Konya Şekerspor in the TFF Second League.

Yeşilkaya previously played for Kocaelispor, Konyaspor and MKE Ankaragücü in the Süper Lig.

References

1980 births
Living people
Turkish footballers
Galatasaray S.K. footballers
Kocaelispor footballers
Konyaspor footballers
Gençlerbirliği S.K. footballers
MKE Ankaragücü footballers
Çaykur Rizespor footballers
Kasımpaşa S.K. footballers
Sivasspor footballers
Association football midfielders